Hamilton, an electoral district of the Legislative Assembly in the Australian state of New South Wales had two incarnations, from 1859 until 1894 and from 1904 until 1920.


Election results

Elections in the 1960s

1968

1965

1962

Elections in the 1950s

1959

1956

1953

1950

Elections in the 1940s

1947

1944

1941

Elections in the 1930s

1938

1935

1934 by-election

1932

1930

Elections in the 1920s

1928 by-election

1927

References

New South Wales state electoral results by district